is a Japanese football player for SC Sagamihara.

Career
After playing for the football team of the Tokyo International University, Furukawa joined SC Sagamihara in January 2018.

Club statistics
Updated to 29 August 2018.

References

External links

Profile at J. League
Profile at SC Sagamihara

1995 births
Living people
Association football people from Saga Prefecture
Japanese footballers
J3 League players
SC Sagamihara players
Association football defenders